Edhathuru is a 2004 Maldivian horror film directed by Yoosuf Shafeeu. Produced by Mohamed Abdulla under Mai Dream Entertainments, the film stars Mohamed Shavin, Sheereen Abdul Wahid, Ali Ahmed, Lufshan Shakeeb, Fathmath Neelam, Nadhiya Hassan, Ibrahim Sobah and Yoosuf Solih in pivotal roles.

Plot
A group of eight friends go on a picnic to a nearby uninhabited island. They start roaming around the island having fun and playing sports. They encounter a man whose name is Hamid (Hamid Ali), who has been living on the island in a hut. He warns the group to return their home before night falls. Things fall apart when Azmee (Ali Ahmed) teases his crush Husna (Sheereen Abdul Wahid) who is in a relationship with Dhaain (Mohamed Shavin). Due to low-tide, they were unable to travel back by sea hence they decided to stay on the island for the night and leave at the earliest light. After the planned night fishing, they spent the rest of the night barbecuing and enjoying horror stories. On exchanging stories, Hamid tells a true incident that had occurred on the island.

Several years ago, Hamid's son, Eevan (Yoosuf Shafeeu) discovers his girlfriend, Taniya (Khadheeja Ibrahim Didi) is having affairs with other men. Having possessed by a spirit inside him, Eevan stabs Taniya killing her. Discovering that he killed Taniya by his own hands, Eevan undergoes a mental breakdown. Hamid brings him to the island where they are currently staying, to distract him and separate him from the society and dies there. Unaish goes to the boat to fetch a torch and is killed by an unknown spirit. Distressed of Unaish's absence, Dhaain goes to the place where the boat was placed and discovers the boat is missing. The whole group gathers to the beach only to find the boat sunk in the sea while Unaish's torch on the ground. They are unable to call anyone due to no connection or signal for their mobile phones.

The group encounters several horrifying incidents. Reena (Nadhiya Hassan) disappears and the event links up with Azmee. Perturbed with their disappearing the group continuously kept searching for them in the woods only to find Unaish's corpse lying in the bush. They later uncover Reena and Hamid's bodies beaten to death. Suspicious of Azmee's involvement in all deaths, Dhaain ties him up to a tree, only to witness Yooshau's death. One by one, members of the group is murdered including Dhaain, Husna and Husham. After the panicking events, a boat sees Taniya and Azmee waving on the island and comes to rescue them. Fearing they will not survive, Azmee rushes into the island to distract the spirit. He was able to come back to the time the boat reaches the shore and so is followed by the spirit.

Cast 
 Mohamed Shavin as Dhaain
 Sheereen Abdul Wahid as Husna
 Ali Ahmed as Azmee
 Lufshan Shakeeb as Husham
 Fathmath Neelam as Taniya
 Nadhiya Hassan as Reena
 Ibrahim Sobah as Unaish
 Yoosuf Solih as Yooshau
 Hamid Ali as Hamid
 Ahmed Asim as Ahmed
 Yoosuf Shafeeu as Eevan
 Khadheeja Ibrahim Didi as Taniya
 Ahmed Azmeel as Anas (Special appearance)
 Abdulla Muaz as Taniya's secret boyfriend (Special appearance)

Soundtrack

Accolades

References

2004 films
2004 horror films
Maldivian horror films
Films directed by Yoosuf Shafeeu